The Hundred of Anna is a cadastral unit of hundred in South Australia. It contains all or most of the localities of Steinfeld, Annadale and Sandleton and small parts of the localities of Dutton East, Truro and Sedan. It is one of the 16 hundreds of the County of Eyre. 

The hundred was named in 1860 by Governor Richard Graves MacDonnell after a daughter of James Chambers who had funded four of John McDouall Stuart's expeditions. It is located on the plains between the Mount Lofty Ranges and the Murray River and is bisected by the Sturt Highway.

References

Anna